The Chester city walls surround what was the extent of the English city of Chester in the medieval period.  They started as a defensive structure for the fortress of Deva Victrix during the Roman occupation of Britain.  Originating between 70 and 90 AD, they consisted of earth ramparts surmounted by wooden palisades.  At intervals there were wooden gates and towers.  Following the arrival of the Legio XX Valeria Victrix at the end of the 1st century the walls were reconstructed in sandstone, and building work continued, with interruptions, until the Roman circuit of the walls was completed over 100 years later. During the same period the towers and gates were rebuilt in stone.  Repairs were carried out on the walls throughout the Roman occupation.  Chester was refortified in 907 by Æthelflæd, but how this affected the walls is not precisely known.  The north and east Roman walls were certainly used in the fortification, as they are still in existence today, but it is possible that they were extended to the west and south to meet the River Dee.

The full circuit of the walls as they are today was completed by the end of the 12th century.  The north and east walls were extended, the west and south walls were built, and the towers and gates were incorporated.  Only the north and east walls contain towers, as the river was thought to be a sufficient defence on the southern and western sides.  Repair of the walls was an ongoing problem during the medieval period, and at some time 3rd-century Roman altars and tombstones were used as raw materials; some of the tombstones are on display in the Grosvenor Museum.  The wall and its towers were damaged during the English Civil War, particularly in the sieges of the city between 1644 and 1646.  Further rebuilding and repairs were carried out following the war, but it was a constant struggle to cope with the scale of the necessary repairs.

By the 18th century the walls had outlived their purpose as a defensive structure, and were becoming popular as a promenade.  In 1707, the city Assembly spent £1,000 (equivalent to £ in ) to repair the walls and to flag the footway.  Distinguished visitors who walked the walls around that time included John Wesley and Samuel Johnson.  The four major gates were replaced, Eastgate, Bridgegate and Watergate during the 18th century and Northgate, with its associated gaol, in 1808–10.  Shortly after 1810, part of the southern section of the walk was demolished to accommodate the yard for the new gaol.  In 1846, the northeastern corner of the walls was breached by the Chester and Holyhead Railway.  Newgate was opened in 1938 to bridge a new road built to relieve traffic congestion in the city centre, and in 1966 St Martin's Gate was built across the Inner Ring Road.

The "walls, tower, gates and posterns of the City of Chester" are recognised as a scheduled monument. All the towers associated with the walls are designated as Grade I listed buildings and all walls are Grade I, except for the wall between Bridgegate and the former County Hall. The gates are all designated Grade I except for Old Newgate, Newgate, and St Martin's Gate.

The editor of the Victoria County History states "the walls still in 2000 formed an almost unbroken pathway and a delight to visitors".

This list starts in the northwest corner with Bonewaldesthorne's Tower, and includes the Water Tower, which is outside the circuit of the walls, but connected by a spur wall to Bonewaldesthorne's Tower.  It then continues in a clockwise direction, starting with the north wall.

Structures

References

Bibliography

External links

Scheduled monuments in Cheshire
Walls in England
Buildings and structures in Chester
Tourist attractions in Cheshire
History of Chester
City walls in the United Kingdom
Towers in Cheshire